Dlouhý (feminine Dlouhá) (meaning "long") is a Czech surname. It may refer to:
 Adam Dlouhý, Czech ice hockey player
 Bedřich Dlouhý
 Lukáš Dlouhý, Czech tennis player
 Oliver Dlouhý, Czech businessman
 Radek Dlouhý, Czech ice hockey player
 Vladimír Dlouhý (actor), Czech actor
 Vladimír Dlouhý (politician), Czech politician

See also
 

Czech-language surnames